The Real Anita Hill is a controversial 1993 book written and now disavowed by David Brock in which the author claimed to reveal the "true motives" that he has revealed he fabricated of Anita Hill, who had accused Supreme Court Justice Clarence Thomas of sexual harassment during his 1991 confirmation hearings.

Background
In March 1992, Brock had authored a sharply critical story about Hill in The American Spectator magazine which became the nucleus of the book, The Real Anita Hill. It was positively reviewed by several people, including George Will in Newsweek, Jonathan Groner, then-associate editor of Legal Times, in The Washington Post ("a serious work of investigative journalism"), and by Christopher Lehmann-Haupt of The New York Times ("carefully reasoned and powerful in its logic"). Excerpts were also printed in the Wall Street Journal. It was negatively reviewed by Jane Mayer and Jill Abramson in The New Yorker, Anna Quindlen in the New York Times, Dierdre English in The Nation, and Anthony Lewis in the New York Times, as well as Molly Ivins, and Ellen Goodman.

Legacy
Brock now describes the book as a "character assassination" and has since "disavowed its premise". He has also apologized to Hill. In his subsequent book, Blinded by the Right, Brock characterized himself as having been "a witting cog in the Republican sleaze machine."

Notes

External links
Booknotes interview with Brock on The Real Anita Hill, June 13, 1993.

1993 non-fiction books
Books about politics of the United States
Books by David Brock
Free Press (publisher) books
John M. Olin Foundation